Research & Development Establishment (Engineers) (R&DE(E) or R&DE(Engrs)) is a laboratory of the Defence Research & Development Organization (DRDO). Located in Pune, Maharashtra, India. its primary function is development of mobility equipment for Indian Army Corps of Engineers

See also
 Drdo Self Propelled Mine Burier

References

External links

 DRDO

Defence Research and Development Organisation laboratories
Research institutes in Pune
Research and development in India
Research institutes established in 1962
1962 establishments in Maharashtra